The 2016 Thailand Five's (Thai:) is an international futsal competition. It was organized by the Football Association of Thailand or the FAT. The tournament is set to be a round-robin format with all matches being held at the Bangkok Arena in Bangkok, Thailand on 20 to 23 August.

This edition will feature the host Thailand and three invited teams. The three teams that have been invited are Iran, Japan and Kazakhstan.

Participant teams 
The 2016 Thailand Five's is following 4 teams include

Venue 
The matches are played at the Bangkok Arena in Bangkok.

Ranking

Results 
 All times are Thailand Standard Time (UTC+07:00).

Day 1

Day 2

Day 3

Final ranking

Goalscorers 
5 goals

  Douglas Júnior
  Suphawut Thueanklang

3 goals

  Farhad Tavakoli
  Mehran Alighadr

2 goals

  Mahdi Javid
  Nibuya Kazuhiro
  Shimizu Kazuya
  Everton Ribeiro
  Leo Jaraguá
  Pavel Taku
  Jirawat Sornwichian

1 goal

  Ahmad Esmaeilpour
  Mohammad Reza Sangsefidi
  Aleksandr Dovgan
  Anton Ryndin
  Dinmukhambet Suleimenov
  Nikolai Pengrin
  Nattawut Madyalan
  Tairong Petchtiam
  Nattapol Sutiroj

1 own goal

  Afshin Kazemi (playing against Thailand)
  Serik Zhamankulov (playing against Thailand)

Broadcasters 
  Thailand: Thairath TV
 World Wide: Thairath's YouTube channel

Ranking after the matches

References

External links 
 Futsal Planet

International futsal competitions hosted by Thailand
2016 in futsal
2016 in Kazakhstani football
2016 in Thai football
2016 in Japanese football
2016–17 in Iranian futsal